Chilagodu is a village in Vijayanagara district in Karnataka.

References
AMS Maps of India and Pakistan

Villages in Bellary district